Kirschner is an Austrian surname, and may refer to:

 Aloisia Kirschner, Austrian novelist
 Ann Kirschner, American academic and author
 David Kirschner, American film and television producer
 Denise Kirschner, American mathematical biologist and immunologist
 Diana Kirschner, American psychologist
 Jana Kirschner, Slovak singer
 Marc Kirschner, American biologist
 Martin Kirschner, German surgeon
Kirschner wire named after him
 Mary-Belle Kirschner, British Internet celebrity, model and YouTuber, better known as Belle Delphine

See also
 Kirshner
 Kirchner